Thyagi is a 1982 Indian Tamil-language action film, directed by C. V. Rajendran and produced by G. Hanumantharao. The film stars Sivaji Ganesan, Sujatha, Major Sundarrajan and V. S. Raghavan. It is a remake of the 1981 Kannada film Antha. The film was released on 3 September 1982.

Plot 
IG Ganesh takes up the place of his doppelganger criminal and don, Kanwarlal to infiltrate their gang, collect evidence and bring them to their justice.   

In the course of his work as Kanwarlal, he has to see the tortured death of his pregnant wife, sister being raped and murdered. He is also forced to ignore the death of his mother too. He bears through all this in the interest of seeing his mission through due to his patriotic nature. He gets caught eventually by the gang and is tortured brutally. He endures all the sacrifices and brings them to the court only for them to get acquitted by extra-judicial means.   

Seeing all his sacrifices go to nothing, he loses his control and kills all involved with his own hands and stands as the culprit in the eyes of the law.

Cast 
Sivaji Ganesan as IG Ganesh/Kanwarlal
Sujatha as Kamala
Sripriya
Geetha
Major Sundarrajan
V. S. Raghavan
Vijayakumar
Pandari Bai
Major Sundarrajan
Y. G. Parthasarathy
Oru Viral Krishna Rao

Soundtrack 
Soundtrack was composed by M. S. Viswanathan, with lyrics by Kannadasan and Vaali.

Controversy 
Thyagi was initially denied a censor certificate by the censor board. One of the members claimed that the makers of the film retained the scenes which were deleted in the original Kannada film.

References

External links 
 

1980s Tamil-language films
1982 action films
1982 films
Films directed by C. V. Rajendran
Films scored by M. S. Viswanathan
Indian action films
Tamil remakes of Kannada films